The Zimbabwe national cricket team toured Bangladesh, playing 5 ODI matches from 1 to 12 December 2010.

Squads

ODI series

Tour match

1st ODI

2nd ODI

3rd ODI

4th ODI

5th ODI

References

2010–11 Zimbabwean cricket season
2010 in Bangladeshi cricket
Bangladeshi cricket seasons from 2000–01
International cricket competitions in 2010–11
2010-11
2010 in Zimbabwean cricket